Garlogie is a roadside hamlet in Aberdeenshire, Scotland. It was, during the 19th century, the site of a textile milling settlement using water from Loch of Skene. The mill is now a museum. Garlogie also has an inn. To the southwest, there is a gas compression and odourisation station which forms part of the National Gas Network.

References

Hamlets in Scotland
Villages in Aberdeenshire